The 1995 All-Ireland Senior Camogie Championship Final was the 64th All-Ireland Final and the deciding match of the 1995 All-Ireland Senior Camogie Championship, an inter-county camogie tournament for the top teams in Ireland.

A late Linda Mellerick goal sealed victory. It was Cork's first defeat of Kilkenny in the final in six attempts.

References

All-Ireland Senior Camogie Championship Final
All-Ireland Senior Camogie Championship Final
All-Ireland Senior Camogie Championship Final, 1995
All-Ireland Senior Camogie Championship Finals
Cork county camogie team matches
Kilkenny county camogie team matches